Pinkus Müller is a German brewery based in the Northern Germany town of Münster. The Pinkus-Müller brewery traces its origins to the arrival of Johannes Müller (1792–1870) in Münster from his hometown of Hildebrandshausen in 1816. After marrying Friederika Cramer they opened a bakery and a brewery. In 1866 the bakery was closed and a malthouse was opened instead. In the following hundred years the brewery and the pub were expanded. In 1993 a bottling plant was opened in the neighbouring city of Laer. It is the only brewery left in Münster from the original 150 breweries.

Products 
 Pinkus Alt
 Pinkus Special
 Hefeweizen
 Pinkus Pils
 Pinkus Leicht
 Pinkus Jubilate
 Müllers Malz
 Pinkus Honig Malz
 Pinkus Alkoholfrei
 Demeter Lagerbier

References

External links 
 http://www.pinkus.de/ - corporate website.

Beer brands of Germany
Breweries in Germany
Companies based in North Rhine-Westphalia
Münster
German companies established in 1816